Skeaping is a surname. Notable people with the surname include:

Colin Skeaping (born 1944), British stuntman 
John Skeaping (1901–1980), British painter and sculptor
Kenneth Mathiason Skeaping (1856–1946), English artist
Lucie Skeaping, British singer, instrumentalist, broadcaster and writer
Mary Skeaping (1902–1984), British ballerina and choreographer
Roddy Skeaping, British composer